Mary Watson may refer to:

Mary Watson (chemist) (1856–1933), British chemist
Mary Watson (folk hero) (1860–1881), Australian folk heroine
Mary Watson (author) (fl. 2000s), South African author
Mrs Watson (Mary Morstan), Mary, wife of Dr Watson, Sherlock Holmes character
Mary Jane Watson, Spider-Man character
Mary Jo Watson, Seminole art historian
Mary Spencer Watson, English sculptor

See also
Mary Watson Whitney, astronomer
Mary Gordon-Watson, equestrian